The 1990 Portuguese Grand Prix was a Formula One motor race held on 23 September 1990 at Autódromo do Estoril. It was the thirteenth race of the 1990 FIA Formula One World Championship. The race was the 19th Portuguese Grand Prix and the seventh to be held at Estoril.

Nigel Mansell took pole position in his Ferrari and was leading when the race was stopped, thus taking his only victory of the season and his last for the Ferrari team. Mansell finished 2.8 seconds ahead of Drivers' Championship leader Ayrton Senna in the McLaren-Honda, who in turn finished 1.3 seconds ahead of rival Alain Prost in the other Ferrari. Senna thus extended his lead over Prost to 18 points with three races remaining.

This also marked the first race in which an effective traction control system was used in Formula One. Scuderia Ferrari used the system on Prost's Ferrari 641; which gave the Frenchman an eventual third-place podium finish. Mansell's 641 was also equipped with the same traction control system; however, the Englishman decided to switch his system off for the race. Nonetheless, he still managed to win the race.

Qualifying

Pre-qualifying report
The Friday morning pre-qualifying session produced a similar result to the previous two races, with the same four cars pre-qualifying, albeit in a slightly different order. Olivier Grouillard was fastest for the third time in a row in the Osella, half a second ahead of the AGS of Yannick Dalmas. Now a regular pre-qualifier after the disastrous period with the Subaru engine, Bertrand Gachot was third fastest in the Coloni, nearly a second ahead of Gabriele Tarquini in the other AGS.

This left the now-usual trio missing out on pre-qualification. The two EuroBruns of Robert Moreno and Claudio Langes were again fifth and sixth, with Langes more than two seconds slower than his team-mate as the team began to lose touch with their rivals. The Life team had finally abandoned their unreliable and vastly underpowered W12 engine, and had fitted the L190 with a well-used Judd CV V8. It had taken ten days to modify the chassis, and the car was now 80 kg lighter. But the engine cover now did not fit properly, and it flew off on Bruno Giacomelli's shakedown lap, halfway through the session. It was slightly damaged and the team had no replacement, so no further running was possible.

Pre-qualifying classification

Qualifying report
Tyrrell's Satoru Nakajima qualified 20th but withdrew due to influenza after crashing in the Sunday morning warm-up session. The grid was adjusted accordingly, although only 25 drivers started as no non-qualifier was reinstated.

Qualifying classification

Race

Race report
At the start, with both Ferraris on the front row (Mansell on pole, Alain Prost second), Mansell got too much wheelspin and slid across the track towards Prost, who had to avoid being shunted into the pitwall. All of this allowed the McLarens of Ayrton Senna and Gerhard Berger to slip past Mansell and Prost to make it a McLaren 1–2 with Senna leading into the first corner. After all the mid race tyre stops, it was Senna who emerged as the race leader, followed by Mansell, Berger, and Prost. A few laps later Mansell had caught Senna and passed him into turn one (Senna letting him through, unlike the year before when they collided).

On lap 52, race leader Nigel Mansell was attempting to lap the Ligier JS33B of Philippe Alliot when the Frenchman stuck to the racing line by driving inches in front of Mansell into the inside of "Curva 2" corner. However, the right rear wheel of his car hit the left front of Mansell's Ferrari and Alliot was sent spinning into the Armco barrier. Mansell came out unscathed from this incident, and eventually won the race which was stopped early due to an accident between Suzuki and Caffi.

Ferrari announced that Jean Alesi would partner Alain Prost for 1991. Alesi was reported to have already signed a contract with Williams, but changed his mind when Ferrari showed an interest, feeling that this would give him a better chance of winning a championship.

Race classification

Championship standings after the race

Drivers' Championship standings

Constructors' Championship standings

References

Portuguese Grand Prix
Portuguese Grand Prix
Grand Prix